Gabriel Over the White House is a 1933 American pre-Code political fantasy film starring Walter Huston as a genial but politically corrupt U.S. President who has a near-fatal automobile accident and comes under divine influence—specifically the Archangel Gabriel and the spirit of Abraham Lincoln. Eventually he takes control of the government, solves the problems of the nation, from unemployment to racketeering, and arranges for worldwide peace, before dying of a heart attack.

The film received the financial backing and creative input of businessman William Randolph Hearst. It was directed by Gregory La Cava, produced by Walter Wanger and written by Carey Wilson based upon the novel Rinehard: A Melodrama of the Nineteen-Thirties (1933) by Thomas Frederic Tweed. Tweed did not receive screen credit (the film's opening credits say "based on the anonymous novel, Gabriel Over the White House) but he was credited in the copyright information. The supporting cast features Karen Morley, Franchot Tone, C. Henry Gordon, and David Landau.

Plot 
Amiable but corrupt U.S. President 'Judd' Hammond (Walter Huston) tells his new secretary Harley “Beek” Beekman (Franchot Tone) that two people may be admitted to his presence at any time: his young nephew Jimmie (Dickie Moore) and Miss Pendola "Pendie" Molloy (Karen Morley). Pendie is the President's mistress and Beek's assistant.

At a press conference, a reporter asks if Hammond will meet with John Bronson (David Landau). Hammond doesn't know who that is; Beekman explains that Bronson is leading a march to Washington of a million men wanting work. Hammond is glib until one young reporter (Mischa Auer) details the collapse of American democracy; he waffles and refuses to be quoted. Later, Hammond laughs as he uses the pen with which Abraham Lincoln signed the Emancipation Proclamation to sign a bill for sewers in Puerto Rico. Bronson speaks eloquently on the radio while Hammond plays with his nephew.

After Hammond crashes his car, Dr. Eastman (Samuel Hinds) declares him “beyond any human help.” A breeze ruffles the curtains and the bed is briefly flooded with light as Hammond insists to himself he will not die. Weeks later, Eastman confides in Beekman and Molloy: the supposedly comatose President is perfectly fine, but is a changed man who sits silently, reading and thinking, “like a gaunt gray ghost". Racketeer Nick Diamond (C. Henry Gordon) tries in vain to bribe and threaten Hammond.

Bronson is killed in a drive-by shooting, but the marchers carry on. In Baltimore, the President walks into the crowd alone and tells Alice Bronson (Jean Parker) that her father was a martyr who died trying “to arouse the stupid, lazy people of the United States to force their government to do something before everybody slowly starves to death.” He promises to create an Army of Construction. Pendie and Beek talk with each other, believing Hammond has gone mad.

That night, the bewildered President doesn't recognize the manuscript for his speech to Congress. Light blooms outside the window; Hammond seems to listen, then straightens, confidently. Meanwhile, Pendie and Beek admit that since the accident, they have both felt that the President was two men. “What if God sent the Angel Gabriel to do for Judd Hammond what he did for Daniel?” Pendie asks.

The President fires the Cabinet and forces Congress to adjourn, declaring that if he is a dictator, it is a dictatorship based on Jefferson's idea of democracy: the greatest good for the greatest number. He broadcasts his plans: an end to foreclosures, a National Banking Law, aid for 55 million agricultural workers, attack racketeering. He has already repealed Prohibition.

The first U.S. Government Liquor Store is bombed, and machine gun fire rakes the White House, gravely wounding Pendie just as she and Beekman are about to confess their love. The President makes Beekman head of the new Federal Police. Diamond believes his lawyer will get him off, but the trial is a court martial. The racketeers are executed.

Hammond holds a worldwide radio broadcast demonstrating the power of his new United States Navy of the Air. Disarmament will free the billions wasted on obsolete weaponry. Hammond signs The Washington Covenant, using the Lincoln quill, and collapses. Pendie is alone with him. The light on his face changes, evoking an image of Lincoln. The shadows disappear as the light at the window returns. Pendie feels Hammond go as the curtains stir. Beek and Pendie come out arm-in-arm to announce the President is dead. Outside, the flag is lowered to half-staff, to the last notes of "Taps".

Cast 

 Walter Huston as President Judson Hammond
 Karen Morley as Pendola “Pendie” Molloy
 Franchot Tone as Hartley “Beek” Beekman, Secretary to the President
 Arthur Byron as Jasper Brooks, Secretary of State
 Dickie Moore as Jimmy Vetter
 C. Henry Gordon as Nick Diamond
 David Landau as John Bronson
 Samuel S. Hinds as Dr. Eastman (billed as Samuel Hinds)
 William Pawley as Borell
 Jean Parker as Alice Bronson
 Claire Du Brey as Nurse (billed as Claire DuBrey)
 John Larkin as Sebastian the Valet (uncredited)

Silent film star Thomas A. Curran also plays an uncredited bit part.

Production
Production began in February 1932. Gabriel over the White House was released on March 31, 1933, with a run time of 85 to 87 minutes.  A review print screened by Daily Variety on December 31, 1932, ran for 102 minutes, indicating that as many as 17 minutes were cut.

Walter Huston had recently portrayed Lincoln in the 1930 biographical film Abraham Lincoln, which was adapted for the screen by Stephen Vincent Benét, author of the epic poem John Brown’s Body, winner of a 1929 Pulitzer Prize. Huston's performance in the film was highly praised, in spite of the fact that the cosmetics used to make him look younger in the scenes of Lincoln's youth had a comical effect.

According to Turner Classic Movies, modern sources have uncovered the fact that Louis B. Mayer did not see the script before filming and, as a staunch Republican and supporter of Herbert Hoover, held the film back until after the inauguration of President Roosevelt on March 4.

In a 2013 article in The New Yorker, Richard Brody wrote that “The story is extraordinary—and so is the story of its production, as told in Matthew Bernstein’s biography of its producer, Walter Wanger, who gave the project its impetus. Hammond is a wild man with a purpose—and the new U.S. President, Franklin D. Roosevelt, loved it. As Bernstein tells it, this was no surprise; the movie was conceived as a Rooseveltian vehicle from the start. Wanger bought the novel on which it was based—a British futuristic fantasy by Thomas W. Tweed—in January, 1933, two months before the inauguration (which, until that year, took place on March 4; the Twentieth Amendment, which passed the same month, moved it to January 20). Wanger rushed the movie into production (Hearst himself wrote some of Hammond’s most flamboyant flights of political rhetoric) and rushed it into production (they shot for two weeks in February) so that it could be released soon after the inauguration.” (However, despite Bernstein's assertions in his biography of producer Wanger, the production timeline given here could not have happened, as the Variety review of a December 1932 pre-release screening of the film cited above proves.)

“Wanger was working under the aegis of the production company owned by William Randolph Hearst, an ardent Roosevelt supporter (and who had much to do with Roosevelt securing the Democratic nomination) whose films were distributed by M-G-M, the boss of which, Louis B. Mayer, was a rock-ribbed Republican. Though Mayer was appalled, he didn’t block its release (on March 31). In a piquant detail, Bernstein reports, “When Wanger, a staunch Roosevelt supporter, approached [the producer Irving] Thalberg about his differences with Mayer over politics and production ideas, Thalberg had told Wanger, ‘Don’t pay any attention to him.’” (Thalberg was the ill-fated “boy wonder” producer who ran the studio along with Mayer, and whom F. Scott Fitzgerald transformed into the title character of The Last Tycoon) Rather, Wanger faced an even higher authority—the censorious Hays Code office, which required some changes, even some reshoots that blunted some of the sharpest political satire.”

Richard Brody, writing for The New Yorker in 2013, says that “One of the reasons for the movie’s impact is its direction, by Gregory La Cava, who is one of the most distinctive of Hollywood talents of the nineteen-thirties and early forties... He’s essentially a comic director, but one whose sense of humor is laced with dark and poignant melodrama. His joltingly mixed moods have a novelistic sensibility, with a fluid and astute visual vulnerability to match. I’ve written here about his 1941 comic drama Unfinished Business, perhaps his masterwork (followed closely by My Man Godfrey and Stage Door) and compared it to a novel by Dawn Powell. In “Gabriel,” Hammond comes off not as a stuffy and out-of-touch grandee such as Hoover, but as a free-swinging, superannuated vestige of the Jazz Age, a character from Fitzgerald in the era of Steinbeck. La Cava's direction of Huston is kaleidoscopically dazzling; together, they turn the abstractions of straw-figure advocacy into an emotionally intricate and ever-surprising character. Hammond's quasi-divine possession comes off as a sort of distanced madness, a fury that grips him not at all blindly; he calmly and unapologetically observes himself rising—or going deeper—into world-historical grandeur. In the presence of radio microphones and world leaders, Hammond delivers a wild speech (dictated by Hearst), that, in its utopian and histrionic extremes, foreshadows the climactic oration by Charlie Chaplin in The Great Dictator even as the specifics of the principled power-grab at the core of the film seem downright fascistic.”

Although an internal MGM synopsis had labeled the script "wildly reactionary and radical to the nth degree," studio boss Louis B. Mayer "learned only when he attended the Glendale, California preview that Hammond gradually turns America into a dictatorship" writes film historian Barbara Hall.  Bernstein contradicts this statement saying that Mayer was kept posted all along, particularly through communications from the censor.  According to Bernstein's biography of Wanger, however, "Mayer was furious, telling his lieutenant, 'Put that picture back in its can, take it back to the studio, and lock it up!'"

Criticism
Variety reviewed the film on December 31, 1932. It described the film as “A mess of political tripe superlatively hoked up into a picture of strong popular possibilities...a cleverly executed commercial release... Huston plays the part so persuasively that witnessers will be tricked into accepting its monstrous exaggerations.” Tone and Morley “carry what amount to walk-on parts and make them look like leads.“

Reviewing it on April 1, 1933, Mordaunt Hall of The New York Times observed “It is a curious, somewhat fantastic and often melodramatic story, but nevertheless one which at this time is very interesting. It is concerned with a fictitious President of the United States named Judson Hammond ...who in the first sequences is portrayed as a careless partisan politician, becomes an earnest and conscientious President, who tackles the problems of unemployment, crime and the foreign debts something after the fashion of a Lincoln.”

The film was labeled by The New Republic as "a half-hearted plea for Fascism".  The Nation said that its purpose was "to convert innocent American movie audiences to a policy of fascist dictatorship in this country."

The blurb for a 1998 film series titled “Religion and the Founding of the American Republic” at The Library of Congress comments on the film as follows:

In a 2018, article for Politico, Jeff Greenfield suggests that the film “offers us significant insights into what tempts countries to travel down an authoritarian road.” “Rushed into production with the financial help of publishing magnate William Randolph Hearst ...it was designed as a clear message to President Franklin Delano Roosevelt that he might need to embrace dictatorial powers to solve the crisis of the Great Depression. (It was an idea embraced by establishment types like columnist Walter Lippmann, and the influential editorial pages of the New York Herald-Tribune.)”

Greenfield adds, “The movie was welcomed by, among others, FDR, who told the filmmakers 'it would do a lot of good.' (It was more than coincidental that the fireside chats, the public works programs and banking reforms all became part of FDR's 'first 100 days.') Gabriel Over the White House was both a critical and commercial hit... It turned a tidy profit of some $200,000. But it faded into obscurity, in large measure because the idea of a ‘benevolent dictatorship' seemed a lot less attractive after the degradation of Hitler, Mussolini and Stalin.“ However, Greenfield sees relevance today, and says the film is worth watching to understand our era.

In a 2013 New Yorker article, Richard Brody wrote:

Newsweeks Jonathan Alter concurred in 2007 that the movie was meant to "prepare the public for a dictatorship."

"An aroma of fascism clung to the heavily edited release print", according to Leonard Leff, co-author of The Dame in the Kimono: Hollywood, Censorship and the Production Code .

It has been described as a "bizarre political fantasy" and which "posits a favorable view of fascism."

Producer Walter Wanger, "a staunch Roosevelt supporter," bought the story in January 1933, two months before FDR's inauguration. After two weeks of script preparation, Wanger secured the financial backing of media magnate William Randolph Hearst.

The film was released in Britain,  but was not a commercial success. Newsreel film of the Royal Navy was spliced into the yacht sequence in the British version, implying that both Britain and the United States were cooperating to obtain disarmament. The movie made a net profit of $206,000.

Notes

References

External links 
 
 
 
 
  "The 34 best political movies ever made", Ann Hornaday, The Washington Post January 23, 2020), ranked #23

1933 films
American black-and-white films
1930s fantasy drama films
Films directed by Gregory La Cava
Films set in Washington, D.C.
Films about fictional presidents of the United States
Great Depression films
Metro-Goldwyn-Mayer films
Films based on British novels
Films produced by Walter Wanger
American fantasy drama films
1930s English-language films
1930s American films